Greenfield railway station in the village of Greenfield, Greater Manchester, England, is on the Huddersfield Line  northeast of Manchester Victoria. It is the final station in Greater Manchester before the West Yorkshire boundary. It is operated by Northern Trains although only Transpennine Express trains call at this station.

History
The line through Greenfield was constructed by the Huddersfield and Manchester Railway, which was absorbed by the London and North Western Railway on 9 July 1847 before any of it was opened.

On 1 September 1851, the branch to  opened, which left the main line at Delph Junction, about a mile to the north of Greenfield; Greenfield was the last station before the junction until  opened in 1912. A second branch, to Oldham, opened on 5 July 1856; it left the main line just to the south of Greenfield.

Passenger services on the Delph & Oldham branches were withdrawn in May 1955, with complete closure following in 1964. A defunct bay can still be seen at the Stalybridge end of the station, which was used by some trains from the Oldham direction. For many years the station had a peak-only service (see BR timetable 1974 et seq.).

The Beeching Report proposed closure of all stations between Stalybridge and Huddersfield. In 1968, half the stations were closed, including Diggle and Saddleworth, leaving only Greenfield to serve the Saddleworth area. That means that Greenfield is Saddleworth's only remaining railway station.

Facilities
Planning permission for the refurbishment of Greenfield railway station was granted in early 2008. This was to provide a new ticket office, refurbished waiting areas, toilets, and possibly a small shop, and was due to be completed in the Winter of 2008. After some problems with planning regulations and the original building contractor going into administration, the new facilities were finally completed in Spring 2009.  The ticket office is staffed on a part-time basis (Mondays to Saturdays, morning to early afternoon only) and there is also a ticket vending machine available.  Step-free access is limited to the Manchester-bound platform only, as the Huddersfield-bound one can only be reached by footbridge.

Manchester mayor Andy Burnham has been campaigning for Greenfield Station to have access to disability friendly facilities, as it remains one of the only stations in Greater Manchester lacking them.

Services
Following the Beeching Cuts in 1968, the station's services were drastically reduced to just a handful of journeys to Manchester and Huddersfield during peak times only, in line with the other local stations on the Huddersfield Line at the time. 

From 1991 however a new improved hourly service in each direction was introduced, with hourly trains to Manchester Victoria calling at all stations as well as to Huddersfield. 

Despite managing the station, Northern Trains do not provide any service to or from this station. 

Since the May 2018 timetable change, TransPennine Express provide the regular stopping service here (hourly each way to Huddersfield and to Manchester Piccadilly). Other TPE services pass through without stopping.

As of 2019, during peak times there is an additional TPE stopping train per hour which runs to Hull, with most of the hourly evening trains also running to Hull.

The station is also handy for the nearby reservoirs of Dovestones, and Chew as well as the whole of Chew Valley in the Peak District National Park.

Since the closure of the Oldham Loop Line in 2009, Greenfield is now the only remaining railway station within the Metropolitan Borough of Oldham.

Future

The Transpennine route through the station is being modernised and upgraded over the course of three Control Periods extending beyond 2029 . It is planned as part of the upgrade that electrification of the line through the station will occur.

Gallery

Notes

External links

Railway stations in the Metropolitan Borough of Oldham
DfT Category E stations
Former London and North Western Railway stations
Railway stations in Great Britain opened in 1849
Saddleworth
1849 establishments in England
Railway stations served by TransPennine Express
Railway stations in Great Britain not served by their managing company